Sean Marquette is an American actor, who is best known for his portrayal as Johnny Atkins in The Goldbergs and Schooled, and for voicing Mac in the Cartoon Network show Foster's Home for Imaginary Friends (2004–2009).

Life and career
His brother Chris is an actor. His father is Cuban. He made his acting debut on television in the soap opera series All My Children in 1995 as Jamie Martin. He has also starred in several other television series including Full-Court Miracle, Without a Trace, NYPD Blue, Standoff, Monk, Still Standing, Ghost Whisperer, In Plain Sight, Bones and NCIS.

His film credits include Black Mask 2: City of Masks as Raymond, National Lampoon's Van Wilder as Little Kid, Full-Court Miracle as Big Ben Swartz, 13 Going on 30 as Young Matt Flamhaff, Surviving Christmas as Older brother, Grilled as Jeremy Goldbluth and Remember the Daze as Mod

Marquette has also worked extensively as a voice actor in various animated television shows and video games, he became the fifth official voice of Sam Dullard in Nickelodeon's Rocket Power, from season 4 until the series finale. He was later cast as the voice of Mac in the Cartoon Network show Foster's Home for Imaginary Friends, he has reprised the role in the television film Destination Imagination and in the video game FusionFall. His other voice credits include Johnny Bravo, Batman Beyond, Fillmore!, Megas XLR, Four Eyes!, Shorty McShorts' Shorts, Avatar: The Last Airbender, The Mummy, and Stuart Little.

He also voiced Peter Parker / Spider-Man in Ultimate Spider-Man video game and has reprised the role in Spider-Man: Battle for New York and Spider-Man 3.

As of 2015, he currently stars as Johnny Atkins in the sitcom television series, The Goldbergs.

Filmography

Film

Television

Video games

References

External links
 

American male child actors
American male soap opera actors
American male television actors
American male voice actors
American male video game actors
Living people
21st-century American male actors
American people of Cuban descent
Cartoon Network people
Male actors from Dallas
Year of birth missing (living people)